Connections may refer to:

Television 
 Connections: An Investigation into Organized Crime in Canada, a documentary television series
 Connections (British documentary), a documentary television series and book by science historian James Burke
 Connections (game show), a British game show of the 1980s

Other 
Connections, a social network analysis journal
 Connections (journal), a military/defense periodical
Connections (video game), a 1995 educational adventure video game
Connections Academy, a free US public school that students attend from home
IBM Connections, a Web 2.0 enterprise social software application
 Connections (album), a 2008 album by A. R. Rahman

See also
Connexions (disambiguation)